Transformers: Human Alliance is a rail shooter arcade game developed by Sega, Set within the Transformers film franchise, it is the first arcade video game in the Transformers franchise. It was showcased in November 2013 at the IAAPA Attractions Show in Orlando; a local Dave & Busters location publicly launched the game at this time. The name is based on the toyline by Hasbro, which were mostly the Transformers characters which came with the humans from the films, and lasted from 2009–2011.

In 2015, Sega introduced a motion simulator attraction based on the game at Joypolis—Transformers: Human Alliance Special. This version of the game utilizes an upgraded, two-passenger version of Sega's previous R360 motion simulator system.

Synopsis

Stage 1: East America
Outside of the city, human civilian Jake is being escorted by Bumblebee and NEST Agent Vanessa, having been tasked to deliver a device to someone. However, his call to Sam Witwicky is cut off, and numerous Decepticons begin chasing them over the highway. Bumblebee arms the humans to fight back, but even with help from NEST reinforcements and Autobot leader Optimus Prime, the three are cornered by more Decepticons led by Starscream.

The team attempts to flee but Starscream throws a tanker truck at them. Outside a nearby factory, Starscream once again corners them and attacks, with the humans joining Bumblebee in fighting back. As they try to save their Autobot friend from Starscream's grasp, the Decepticon grabs them briefly before they try to blast their way free, but costing Jake the device as he drops it which is later stolen by Laserbeak. They continue to fight off Starscream's attacks until Optimus Prime shows up, plowing into the scheming Decepticon and ending the fight. However, despite being threatened by Optimus, Starscream wins the battle having retrieved the device with the help from Laserbeak; the two Decepticons depart. Following the level, the player can choose either to go help Sideswipe in England or Optimus Prime in the Sahara Desert.

Stage 2A: England Central City
NEST soldiers are ambushed by Decepticon drones under Soundwave's command while trying to investigate the epicenter of an earthquake. Vanessa and Jake, accompanied by Sideswipe, respond to the team's call for assistance, taking on numerous Decepticon drones. However the enemy proves too much to handle and Sideswipe is forced to flee into a tunnel, with Soundwave himself giving chase. In the ensuing chase, Sideswipe leaps through buildings taking out numerous drones, though Jake himself throws up due to the movement. Soundwave catches up to them as they reach a nearby bridge, forcing the Autobot to take on both him and Laserbeak. With the help from Jake and Vanessa, Sideswipe is victorious and the group finish crossing the bridge.

Moving at high-speed through the city, they take out more drones from both the land and the sky. NEST headquarters radios in to confirm the presence of another Decepticon, at which point a tank rolls into view and attacks them by firing a barrage of missiles. Sideswipe and the humans manage to survive the assault, but the tank transforms into Brawler and fires another round of missiles at them. The team are able to take out the turrets one at a time, but Brawler simply tosses Sideswipe aside now focusing his fury on Vanessa and Jake. The Decepticon is later brought down by the humans' attack and Optimus Prime later appears to demand him if the Decepticons are behind the earthquake, only to succumb to his injuries before Optimus can get any information from him.

Stage 2B: Sahara Desert
Vanessa and Jake accompany Optimus Prime to Africa following the source of earthquakes. When they arrive, the town appears to be abandoned but it is revealed that they have been lured into an ambush. Despite the Autobots best efforts, the humans have to fend off everything from mechanical buzzards to hordes of insects before Optimus helps them make their getaway over the city's rooftops.

References

2013 video games
Arcade video games
Arcade-only video games
Rail shooters
Sega arcade games
Human Alliance
Video games developed in China